Filip Albrecht (born 28 November 1977) is a Czech-German lyricist, manager, producer, film distributor, TV host and writer.

Life and career

Born in Munich, Albrecht grew up in Bavaria. In 1999 he decided to move to Prague and to found a media company to distribute Czech movies all over the world.

In 2001 he began to work as the German lyricist for the two international most successful Czech singers, Karel Gott and Helena Vondráčková, writing for them from 2001 to 2017 over 30 songs such as Jede Nacht, Das Lachen meiner Kinder or Schau nach vorn, which were released mainly in the German market (Universal Music Group Germany, Electrola). Since 2003 he is Vondráčkova's producer and manager for Germany, Austria and Switzerland. Albrecht is also the manager of legendary Czech actor and entertainer Pavel Trávníček (Three Nuts for Cinderella).

In 2002 he started his cooperation with the Zlín Film Festival being named the Head of International Relations by Czech culture minister Vítěžslav Jandák, and afterwards also with the Febiofest. From 2002–2015 he brought to the Czech Republic dozens of film personalities like Peter Ustinov, Jürgen Prochnow, Helmut Berger, Maximilian Schell, Pierre Brice, Ottfried Fischer, Hanna Schygulla, Dani Levy, Gojko Mitić, Frank Beyer, Götz George or Armin Mueller-Stahl. As a librettist he wrote the German version of the fairy tale Tři bratři ("Three Brothers"), directed by Academy Award winner Jan Svěrák, and the ice show Aschenputtel on Ice.
 
Since 2013 Albrecht is the programme director and vice president of the popular Czech television channels Šlágr TV and Country Nr.1. He is the co-author and ghostwriter of Karel Gott's autobiography Zwischen zwei Welten ("Between Two Worlds"), which was released in Germany in May 2014.

Albrecht hosts the Czech-Slovak television show Se Šlágrem na cestách ("With Music on the Road") and appears on several celebrity talkshows. For his work as an "ambassador" of Czech music and television shows he was honoured in the Smago Award 2014 ceremony with the ADS Medienpreis by the Arbeitsgemeinschaft Deutscher Schlager & Volksmusik e.v. in Berlin in November 2014.

He is the coproducer of the biographical film movie The Devil's Mistress (director: Filip Renč) about the life of Czech actress Lída Baarová and her affair with Joseph Goebbels starring Karl Markovics, Gedeon Burkhard and Tatiana Pauhofova. World premiere was in January 2016 in Prague under the attendance of Czech president Miloš Zeman.

In October 2016 he was named the Festival Director of the first European Fairy Tale Film Festival Internationales Märchenfilmfestival Fabulix in Annaberg-Buchholz (Saxony). Albrecht is a founding member of the festival. The first edition of the festival (2017) took place from 23 August to the 27th, and was visited by over 20.000 guests.

Albrecht is a member of the Rotary Club Prague International.

He lives in Prague and in Nice.

References

External links 

1977 births
Living people
Czech television personalities
German lyricists
Czech male writers
German male writers
German emigrants to the Czech Republic
Mass media people from Prague
Writers from Prague